Laura Douglas may refer to:

 Laura Douglas (athlete), Welsh athlete
 Laura Douglas (artist), American painter
Laura Douglas (singer-songwriter)